Miriam Rautert (born 21 March 1996) is a German model and beauty pageant titleholder who was crowned Miss Universe Germany 2019. She represented Germany at the Miss Universe 2019 pageant. In 2021, she became a contestant in Germany's Next Topmodel (season 16).

Personal life
Rautert was born on 21 March 1996 in Port of Spain, Trinidad and Tobago and raised in Hagen, Germany. She has a degree in journalism and corporate communication from a private university in Iserlohn, and moved to Berlin for the sixth semester in 2018. Rautert is the  first Miss Universe Germany of mixed ethnicity.

Pageantry

Miss Universe Germany 2019 
Rautert joined at a major national pageant, this time at the Miss Universe Germany 2019 competition in Berlin on September 1, 2019. She went on to win the competition, beating the runners-up were Christine Annabelle Keller and Alena Krempl. Rautert was crowned by outgoing  Miss Universe Germany 2018 Celine Willers.

Miss Universe 2019 
As Miss Universe Germany, Rautert represented Germany at the Miss Universe 2019 where she did not place.

References

External links

1996 births
German beauty pageant winners
German female models
German people of Trinidad and Tobago descent
Living people
Miss Universe 2019 contestants
Miss Universe Germany
People from Hagen
People from Port of Spain
Trinidad and Tobago emigrants to Germany